Neumont College of Computer Science (formerly Neumont University, originally named Northface University) is a private for-profit career college in Salt Lake City, Utah. It was founded in 2003 by Graham Doxey, Scott McKinley, and Marlow Einelund. The college focuses on applied computer science and is accredited by Northwest Commission on College and Universities.

Academics
Neumont's degree programs focus on the computer sciences offering three-year degrees in Computer Science, Technology Management, Software and Game Development, Web Design and Development, Information Systems, and Software Engineering. The college is accredited by the Northwest Commission on College and Universities NWCCU to award associate and bachelor's degrees in computer science.

Recent history
From July through September 2007, Neumont briefly expanded to Virginia, leasing a suite in the Dulles Town Center mall.  The expansion was cancelled after one academic quarter.

In August 2012, Neumont University announced plans to relocate its academic facilities and student housing to 143 South Main Street, Salt Lake City, an 11-story art deco building which formerly housed The Salt Lake Tribune. The school officially relocated to its downtown Salt Lake City location in June 2013, with the first new cohort of students beginning classes in October.

On July 28, 2017, president Shaun McAlmont announced the institution's name change from Neumont University to Neumont College of Computer Science.

Presidents
 Graham Doxey (2003–2007)
 Edward H. Levine (2007–2015)
 Shaun McAlmont (2015–2017)
 Aaron Reed (2017–present)

References

External links

 Official website

Private universities and colleges in Utah
For-profit universities and colleges in the United States
Educational institutions established in 2003
Universities and colleges in Salt Lake County, Utah
2003 establishments in Utah